The Arena Football League 15th Anniversary Team was compiled in 2001 to show the league's best players in its 15-year history.

First Team

Second Team

References

Arena Football League trophies and awards